Gibraltar competed in the 2010 Commonwealth Games held in Delhi, India, from 3 to 14 October 2010.

Fifteen athletes were named to the team.

Team Gibraltar at the 2010 Commonwealth Games
Chef de mission – Harry Murphy
Team manager – Joe Schembri

Aquatics

Swimming

Men

Women

Cycling

Road

Men

Gymnastics

Rhythmic

Shooting

Clay Target
Men

Pistol
Men

Small Bore and Air Rifle
Men

Tennis

See also
 2010 Commonwealth Games

References

Nations at the 2010 Commonwealth Games
Gibraltar at the Commonwealth Games
Comm